King Yih of Zhou, personal name Ji Jian, was the seventh king of the Chinese Zhou Dynasty. Estimated dates of his reign are 899–892 BC or 899–873 BC.

His reign is poorly documented.  The first year of his reign is confirmed by a solar eclipse on April 21, 899. He was followed on the throne by his uncle King Xiao of Zhou who was followed by King Yih's son King Yí of Zhou who was "restored by the many lords". He is said to have moved from the capital to a place called Huaili. This hints that he was removed from power by his uncle, but the matter is uncertain. Yih's grandson was King Li of Zhou.

Family
Queens:
 Wang Bo Jiang, of the Jiang clan, the mother of Crown Prince Xie and a daughter

Sons:
 Crown Prince Xie (d. 878 BC), ruled as King Yí of Zhou from 885–878 BC

Ancestry

See also
Family tree of ancient Chinese emperors

Sources 

892 BC deaths
Zhou dynasty kings
9th-century BC Chinese monarchs
Year of birth unknown